When Night Falls on the Reeperbahn (German: Wenn es Nacht wird auf der Reeperbahn) is a 1967 West German crime film directed by Rolf Olsen and starring Erik Schumann, Fritz Wepper and Konrad Georg. It was shot at the Tempelhof Studios in Berlin and on location around Hamburg. The role played by Konrad Georg was modelled on a similar one he played in the television series Kommissar Freytag.

The film was a commercial success and over the next few years Olsen directed several further Hamburg-set crime films, many of them starring Curd Jürgens.

Cast

References

External links

1967 crime films
German crime films
West German films
Films directed by Rolf Olsen
Constantin Film films
Films set in Hamburg
Films shot in Hamburg
Films shot at Tempelhof Studios
1960s German-language films
1960s German films